Barshaw Park is public park in Paisley, Scotland. It has  of recreational parkland and garden areas which are open to the public.

History
In the early 20th century, the local council of Paisley was looking to create a public recreation area. A wealthy local family, the Arthurs, sold  of land to Paisley Burgh Council (now Renfrewshire Council) in 1911. Ground works were carried out at the site and the park opened on 15 June 1912.

Barshaw House was included with the sale of the land. It is a mansion situated within the park and was the home of the Arthurs. The building over the years has been a private house, military hospital, care home and now luxury flats.

Amenities
The park offers various amenities and activities for the general public. These include a boating pond, walled garden, bmx track,  miniature railway,  swing park  and a municipal golf course. Special events like funfair day and open gala days are hosted at the park.

Gallery

References

Tourist attractions in Scotland
Parks in Renfrewshire